Robocasting (also known as robotic material extrusion) is an additive manufacturing technique analogous to Direct Ink Writing and other extrusion-based 3D-printing techniques in which a filament of a paste-like material is extruded from a small nozzle while the nozzle is moved across a platform. The object is thus built by printing the required shape layer by layer.  The technique was first developed in the United States in 1996 as a method to allow geometrically complex ceramic green bodies to be produced by additive manufacturing. In robocasting, a 3D CAD model is divided up into layers in a similar manner to other additive manufacturing techniques. The material (typically a ceramic slurry) is then extruded through a small nozzle as the nozzle's position is controlled, drawing out the shape of each layer of the CAD model. The material exits the nozzle in a liquid-like state but retains its shape immediately, exploiting the rheological property of shear thinning. It is distinct from fused deposition modelling as it does not rely on the solidification or drying to retain its shape after extrusion.

Process
Robocasting begins with a software process. One method is importing an STL file and slicing that shape into layers of similar thickness to the nozzle diameter. The part is produced by extruding a continuous filament of material in the shape required to fill the first layer. Next, either the stage is moved down or the nozzle is moved up and the next layer is deposited in the required pattern. This is repeated until the 3D part is complete. Numerically controlled mechanisms are typically used to move the nozzle in a calculated tool-path generated by a computer-aided manufacturing (CAM) software package. Stepper motors or servo motors are usually employed to move the nozzle with precision as fine as nanometers.

The part is typically very fragile and soft at this point. Drying, debinding and sintering usually follow to give the part the desired mechanical properties.

Depending on the material composition, printing speed and printing environment, robocasting can typically deal with moderate overhangs and large spanning regions many times the filament diameter in length, where the structure is unsupported from below. This allows intricate periodic 3D scaffolds to be printed with ease, a capability which is not possessed by other additive manufacturing techniques. These parts have shown extensive promise in fields of photonic crystals, bone transplants, catalyst supports, and filters. Furthermore, supporting structures can also be printed from a "fugitive material" which is easily removed. This allows almost any shape to be printed in any orientation.

Applications

The technique can produce non-dense ceramic bodies which can be fragile and must be sintered before they can be used for most applications, analogous to a wet clay ceramic pot before being fired. A wide variety of different geometries can be formed from the technique, from solid monolithic parts to intricate microscale "scaffolds", and tailored composite materials. A heavily-researched application for robocasting is in the production of biologically compatible tissue implants. "Woodpile" stacked lattice structures can be formed quite easily which allow bone and other tissues in the human body to grow and eventually replace the transplant. With various medical scanning techniques the precise shape of the missing tissue was established and input into 3D modelling software and printed. Calcium phosphate glasses and hydroxyapatite have been extensively explored as candidate materials due to their biocompatibility and structural similarity to bone.
Other potential applications include the production of specific high surface area structures, such as catalyst beds or fuel cell electrolytes. Advanced metal matrix- and ceramic matrix- load bearing composites can be formed by infiltrating woodpile bodies with molten glasses, alloys or slurries.

Robocasting has also been used to deposit polymer and sol-gel inks through much finer nozzle diameters (less than 2 μm) than is possible with ceramic inks.

References

External links

Ceramic engineering
3D printing processes
Articles containing video clips
1996 introductions
American inventions
1996 establishments in the United States